Myliobatiformes is one of the four orders of batoids, cartilaginous fishes related to sharks. They were formerly included in the order Rajiformes, but more recent phylogenetic studies have shown the myliobatiforms to be a monophyletic group, and  its more derived members evolved their highly flattened shapes independently of the skates.

Classification
Nelson's Fishes of the World arranges the Myliobatiformes as:

Suborder Platyrhinoidei
Family Platyrhinidae (thornbacks)
Suborder Zanobatoidei 
Family Zanobatidae (panrays)
Suborder Myliobatoidei (stingrays)
Superfamily Hexatrygonoidea
Family Hexatrygonidae (sixgill stingray)
Superfamily Urolophoidea
Family Plesiobatidae (deepwater stingray)
Family Urolophidae (round stingrays)
Superfamily Urotrygonoidea
Family Urotrygonidae (American round stingrays)
Superfamily Dasyatoidea
Family Dasyatidae (whiptail stingrays)
Family Potamotrygonidae (river stingrays)
Family Gymnuridae (butterfly rays)
Family Myliobatidae (eagle rays)
Subfamily Myliobatinae (eagle rays)
Subfamily Mobulinae (manta rays, devil rays)
Subfamily Rhinopterinae (cownose rays)

The family Aetobatidae is recognised  by some authorities. It contains the genus Aetobatus, which is otherwise part of Myliobatinae.

References

 
Rays
Taxa named by Leonard Compagno
Cartilaginous fish orders